Benčić is a Croatian and Serbian surname. It is the most common surname in Istria County in Croatia. Notable people with the surname include:

 Belinda Bencic (born 1997), Swiss tennis player of Slovak descent
 Irma Benčić (died 1945), Croatian resistance fighter
 Ljubo Benčić (1905–1992), Croatian and Yugoslav footballer
 Vojkan Benčić (born 1969), Serbian basketball player and coach

References

Croatian surnames
Serbian surnames
Patronymic surnames